Penstemon australis is a perennial plant native to the wetlands of Florida, with the common name Eustis Lake beardtongue.

It has pink or purple tubular flowers and pointed leaves.

It is in the family Plantaginaceae.

References 

australis
Flora of Florida